Sotomura (written: 外村) is a Japanese surname. Notable people with the surname include:

Joanna Sotomura (born 1987), American actress
, Japanese gymnast

See also
Satomura

Japanese-language surnames